John G. Mitchell (b. Cincinnati, Ohio – died July 7, 2007 Albany, NY) was an American environmentalist and former editor of National Geographic from 1994 until 2004.

References

External links
"John G. Mitchell; Editor At National Geographic", Washington Post

National Geographic Society
Writers from Cincinnati

2007 deaths
Year of birth missing